William Burns (Born December 1952 – 23 August 2019), usually known as "Bill Burns", was an English football referee who officiated in the Football League.

Born in Scarborough, Burns refereed the 1996 Football League Third Division play-off Final, and the 2001 Football League Trophy Final. Having officiated since 1985, he retired as a Football League referee at the end of the 2000–01 season, at the age of 48. In 2002, he bought a pub in Scarborough with his wife, Jenny. In later life, he underwent a successful double liver transplant at St James's University Hospital in Leeds.

He died on 23 August 2019 aged 66 after a long battle with primary sclerosing cholangitis.

References

External links
William Burns referee statistics at Soccerbase

1952 births
Sportspeople from Scarborough, North Yorkshire
Living people
English football referees
English Football League referees